Alimpashayurt (Alimpaşa-yurt; , Älimpaşa-yurt) is a rural locality (a selo) in Gemetyubinsky Selsoviet, Babayurtovsky District, Republic of Dagestan, Russia. The population was 693 as of 2010. There are 13 streets.

Geography 
Alimpashayurt is located 6 km southeast of Babayurt (the district's administrative centre) by road. Babayurt is the nearest rural locality.

References 

Rural localities in Babayurtovsky District